is a website operated by illustrator  that offers gratis illustrations. These works can be used free of charge by individuals and corporations, commercial and non-commercial, but copyright is not waived and there are moral rights related restrictions on how they can be used.

Overview 

The site has a diverse range of materials with cute and heartwarming designs that meet the general demand for free-to-use illustrations, and has gained a reputation as a site where you can always find the materials you want. Some of his illustrations are on current affairs and dark humour themes, and the gap between his drawings and themes is also considered attractive. The short time lag between the news and the announcement of the illustrations attracted attention, and the project attracted a lot of attention on Twitter, and was introduced on well-known news websites. The mascot character is a black rabbit named Pikyoko.

Before the appearance of Irasutoya, there were sites offering free materials, but there was a problem that the taste of the pictures could not be matched if illustrations from various sites were collected and used. On the other hand, Irasutoya has a huge variety of illustrations, and users can get all the materials they need from this site alone, which is an advantage for the users

Commercial and corporate use is also free of charge as long as it is within the scope of the terms of use.

A Twitter trend to recreate LPs, CDs, game jackets, manga and light novels and scenes from manga and light novels using illustrations from Irastuya went viral. A video recreating the anime's opening footage using materials from Irastuya has also been released.

A smartphone game using illustrations from Irasutoya has also been released.

On the other hand, the problem of taking away the work of other illustrators due to the free service and its convenience

The site was updated almost daily after the release of the Setsubun illustrations on 31 January 2012, but as Mifune became too busy to maintain the pace of updates, he temporarily stopped updating the site on 31 January 2021. Since then, updates have been irregular, with a few illustrations uploaded per month.

In March 2019, he published an illustration based on the then much-discussed . It drew a response of "working too fast"; when he announced the release of the illustration on Twitter, the corresponding tweet attracted 15,000 retweets . In 2021, the company also collaborated with One Piece and Made in Abyss, and in 2022 it collaborated with Tyrol Chocolate and Sesame Street and Inana.

Features 

Initially, the illustrations were mainly of general seasons and events, but gradually illustrations of (sometimes satirical) current events began to be published; around February 2016, when complete gachas in social games for smartphones, where the desired item is hard to win, became an issue. An illustration of a person spinning a giant gacha-gacha was uploaded, saying, "This is an illustration of a person who keeps spinning a gacha-gacha that has a very low chance of winning." and introduced the topic.

From the outset, the site has been full of highly versatile illustrations, including orthodox ones such as seasonal and occupational illustrations, flora and fauna, and template material (a hand holding a smartphone with a blank screen, a surprised child and a blank speech bubble). Further social themes (refugee, fake news, conspiracy) and current events (3D printer weapon production, same-sex marriage, virtual reality, hand spinner) have been added from time to time.

Unusual occupations such as nosmiologists, bird patrollers, and foresters are depicted, as are special machines like miso soup dispensers, centrifuges, transmission electron microscopes; minor instruments (didgeridoo, zampoña, cor anglais), dinosaurs and other ancient creatures such as Hallucigenia and Pikaia, and subjects from fantasy and games (Hero, Mi-go, Buer), many of which are rare in the free culture world. They also illustrate characters often used on the internet, such as "precious" and "this is my personal opinion".

There are many illustrations of foreigners, but not only in broad categories such as white or black, but also in detailed situations such as international school, teachers, evacuation drills, eating Japanese food, etc., as well as Selknum people with distinctive body painting, pink suits sap, high mountain women with distinctive headdresses, Muslim brides and grooms in traditional wedding costumes, and many other illustrations related to ethnic costumes and decorative culture.

For people, illustrations include men, women, children, adults, elderly, Caucasian, Black and Asian; same-sex couples, gay and lesbian; Japan Self-Defence Forces personnel for land, sea and air; covert photography such compact cameras and smartphones; gaming mice, wired and wireless; wisdom teeth, straight and sideways, etc. There are also many different patterns of the same subject matter, such as chupacabras bipedal and quadrupedal.

As mentioned above, the illustrations are mainly versatile enough to be used in POP and flyers, but some are illustrations of "adolescent boys immersed in their own unique world of narcissism and delusions of grandeur." Some are described as "chuunibyou illustrations", so-called "Aikatsu! uncle", illustrations of a sober male voice actor with glasses whose title is "Ikebo", etc., or those that are less generic (nasogyoji, fish said to live on Europa, the Antikythera mechanism); situations that are special ones (a company employee peacefully sleeping in a submerged office, a person collecting oil floating on the surface of ramen soup) are also offered in large quantities.

In March 2016, Mifune announced the sealing off of current affairs illustrations, saying that "I feel that if I keep up with current affairs any longer, irasutoya will become like a job and I won't be able to enjoy drawing them", but after some time later, the Ministry of Internal Affairs and Communications and mobile phone companies, they have released illustrations of current affairs such as "two-year bondage" and "freedom from two-year bondage", which are common in mobile phone contracts.

Collaboration 

Irastoya embroidered handkerchiefs were sold at Nakamise in Asakusa from 25 December 2017 for 864 yen per piece (tax included) with five different illustrations (boy, girl, boy and Kaminarimon, girl and Kaminarimon, and animals).

A 2018 collaboration café with Kamakura Coffee appeared for a limited time from 23 January to 1 April. Also in the same year, in collaboration with I'm standing on a million lives, serialised in Bessatsu Shonen Magazine, a special "Wakeari Free Edition" in which all panels from the latest five volumes of the work's comics were replaced with Irastoya material was published for free on the official website "Magamega", including Weekly Shonen Magazine.

In the first episode of the first season of the One Million Lives television anime of I'm Standing on a Million Lives, the "Wakeari Version" was broadcast and distributed using Irasutoya for the fastest terrestrial broadcast and fastest internet distribution in October 2020. 4 January 2021. To celebrate the 1000th episode of the manga series One Piece, 20 illustration materials of characters from the work were released. This is the first time that illustration materials with copyrights have been released, and with the permission of Shueisha, they can be used within the scope of the rules of use, just like other materials, as long as the use does not damage the image of the work.

In November 2021, the Made in Abyss collaborated with Made in Abyss to develop the "Made in Abyss x Irastoya Online Kuji Lottery" on the online lottery site "Kujiwari-do". In January 2022, the Chocolate "Irastoya BOX" was sold in collaboration with Tyrol Chocolate. In March of the same year, they collaborated with Sesame Street on the "Sesame Street Irasutoya BIG Plushie". In April of the same year, he also announced the production of a LINE Stamp in collaboration with Inana.

Awards 

 2019 - Society for Digital Archiving '1st Society Award' Practice Prize (2018)
 2022 - Digital Media Association 'Digital Content of the Year '21 / 27th AMD Awards' Excellence Award (FY2021)

Notes

See also 

 Stock illustration
 Stock photography

References

External links 

 
 
 

Illustration
Japanese websites
2012 web series debuts
Japanese graphic designers
Advertising people